The men's 50 kilometres walk at the 2015 World Championships in Athletics was held at the Beijing National Stadium on 29 August.

Records
Prior to the competition, the records were as follows:

Qualification standards

Schedule

Results
The race was started at 07:30.

References

50 kilometres walk
Racewalking at the World Athletics Championships